Waterway Parks is the designation given by the Provincial Parks System of Ontario, Canada, for parks which are river corridors that provide canoeists with high-quality recreation and historical river travel.

See also 
List of Ontario parks

References